|}

The Morebattle Hurdle is a National Hunt handicap hurdle race in Scotland which is open to horses aged four years or older. 
It is run at Kelso over a distance of about 2 miles and 2 furlongs (2 miles, 2 furlongs and 25 yards, or ) and during it there are ten hurdles to be jumped. It is scheduled to take place each year in February.

The race was first run as a conditions contest in 1984 having previously been a handicap race.  It was won four times in a row by Jinxy Jack until 1993, and was named in his honour in 1994, when he finished third. It reverted to handicap status from the 2021 running.

Winners

See also
Horse racing in Great Britain
List of British National Hunt races

References

Racing Post:

Kelso Racecourse
National Hunt hurdle races
National Hunt races in Great Britain
Recurring sporting events established in 1988
1988 establishments in Scotland